Padda is a genus of finches from Indonesia

Padda can also refer to:

Places 

 Padda, Kapurthala, a village in India
 Padda Island in Antarctica

People 

 Jaimal Singh Padda, an Indian poet and communist activist
 Bali Padda, a British businessman